Sanseitō ( officially the Party of Do it Yourself !! in English) is a right-wing populist political party in Japan. The party was founded in 2020 and won a seat in the 2022 House of Councillors election, also becoming an official political party by winning more than 2% of the vote in the election.

History 
The party was founded in March 2020, and became active in April of that year.

The party fielded five candidates for the national proportional representation block and 45 candidates in all constituencies for the 2022 Japanese House of Councillors election. Sohei Kamiya, a Sanseitō candidate in the national proportional representation block, won a seat. The party received more than 2% of the vote in the constituencies and proportional representation block, meeting the legal requirements for it to become a political party.

Ideology and policies 
The party is known for its extremely conservative flavour. It also wants the Japanese public to be able to opt out of wearing masks and taking vaccines during the COVID-19 pandemic and has "characterized the pandemic as being staged". In the 2022 Japanese House of Councillors election, the party's key policies were "education reform" to develop the ability to think and value tradition, "food safety" to promote pesticide-free and other products, "national protection" to regulate foreign investment, and "liberalisation of mask wearing" for the policies against coronavirus. For these reasons, the party is criticized as a far-right political party with conspiracy theories, such as anti-vaccine and masks.

The party is in favour of rewriting the Constitution and a defense budget increase of up to 3 percent of the GDP.

Supporters 
According to Mina Okamura, a clinical psychologist and business psychology consultant, people who have been indifferent to politics and elections were interested in the keywords "anti-vaccine," "no mask," and "organic". Those policies were easy to catch on to whom did not study politics. The Sanseitō voters' do not think one's vote can change politics but encourage political parties, which already exist, to try to do what they think is good. The speech is emotionally rather than logically appealing. Therefore, they appeal to the sensibilities of the politically inexperienced and have increased their support. 

According to Japanese political analyst Hiroo Hagino, the party is supported by the younger population, who have become disappointed with politics centred on the elderly. According to a JNN survey, a higher proportion of young people voted for Sanseitō in the last election. Some Liberal Democratic Party (LDP) officials expressed worry that they might lose votes because both parties have conservative policies. Most of the Sanseitō voters do not support the current Kishida government.

Election results

House of Councillors

Notes

References 

Political parties established in 2020
2020 establishments in Japan
Anti-immigration politics in Asia
Conservative parties in Japan
COVID-19 misinformation
Far-right political parties
Far-right politics in Japan
Nationalist parties in Japan
Political parties in Japan
Right-wing populism in Japan
Right-wing populist parties